Gulalpur is a village in Bakshi Ka Talab block of Lucknow district, Uttar Pradesh, India. As of 2011, its population is 1,783, in 319 households.

References 

Villages in Lucknow district